ISO/IEC JTC 1/SC 29, entitled Coding of audio, picture, multimedia and hypermedia information, is a standardization subcommittee of the Joint Technical Committee ISO/IEC JTC 1 of the International Organization for Standardization (ISO) and the International Electrotechnical Commission (IEC). It develops and facilitates international standards, technical reports, and technical specifications within the field of audio, picture, multimedia, and hypermedia information coding. SC 29 includes the well-known JPEG and MPEG experts groups, and the standards developed by SC 29 have been recognized by nine Emmy Awards.

The international secretariat of SC 29 is the Japanese Industrial Standards Committee (JISC) of Japan.

History
ISO/IEC JTC 1/SC 29 was established in 1991, when the subcommittee took over the tasks of ISO/IEC JTC 1/SC 2/WG 8. Its title, "Coded representation of audio, picture, multimedia and hypermedia information", has not been changed since its inception. Within its first year, SC 29 established four working groups, a secretariat, and working group conveners, and held its first plenary in Tokyo, Japan. Its founding chair was Hiroshi Yasuda of NTT, who continued to serve in that capacity through 1999. Subsequent chairs have been Hiroshi Watanabe of NTT (2000–2006), Kohtaro Asai of Mitsubishi Electric (2007–2017), Teruhiko Suzuki of Sony (2018–2020), and Gary Sullivan of Microsoft (2021–present).

As of January 2023, ISO/IEC JTC 1/SC 29 is responsible for 610 currently published standards and updates of standards, including standards for JPEG (ISO/IEC 10918-1), JPEG-2000 (ISO/IEC 15444-1), MPEG-1 (ISO/IEC 11172-1), MPEG-2 (ISO/IEC 13818), MPEG-4 (ISO/IEC 14996), MPEG-4 AVC (ISO/IEC 14496-10), JBIG (ISO/IEC 11544), MHEG-5 (ISO/IEC 13522-5), etc.

Emmy Award recognitions 
ISO/IEC JTC 1/SC 29 has received nine Emmy Awards in recognition of the standards it has developed.
In 1996, when the JPEG, MPEG-1, and MPEG-2 standards became widely recognized for their technological advancements, SC 29 was awarded a 1995–1996 Technology and Engineering Emmy Award for Outstanding Achievement in Technical/Engineering Development.
The MPEG-4 AVC video coding standard also won two Emmys:
The Primetime Emmy Engineering Award in September 2008 for the High Profile of the standard
The Technology and Engineering Emmy Award in January 2009 (for the standard as a whole)
The MPEG-2 transport stream format was recognized by a Technology and Engineering Emmy Award in 2014.
The High Efficiency Video Coding (HEVC) standard was recognized by a Primetime Emmy Engineering Award in 2017.
The JPEG standard was recognized by a Primetime Emmy Engineering Award in 2019.
The ISO Base Media File Format (ISOBMFF) standard was recognized by a Technology and Engineering Emmy Award in 2021.
Two Technology and Engineering Emmy Awards were received in 2022:
 The MPEG-DASH video streaming protocol
 The Open Font Format standard

Scope
The scope of ISO/IEC JTC 1/SC 29 includes the development of standards for "efficient coding of digital representations of images, audio and moving pictures" and other digital information, along with supporting media systems and associated quality of experience and performance metrics.

Structure
ISO/IEC JTC 1/SC 29 has eight active working groups (WGs), each of which carries out specific tasks in standards development within scope of the subcommittee. It also contains five advisory groups (AG) for coordination and to provide expertise on particular subjects. Working groups and advisory groups can be created or disbanded by decisions of the subcommittee and are ordinarily chartered for renewable three-year terms. The focus of each working group is described in the group's terms of reference. The active advisory groups and working groups of SC 29 are:

Collaborations
ISO/IEC JTC 1/SC 29 works in close collaboration with a number of other organizations or subcommittees, both internal and external to ISO or IEC, in order to avoid conflicting or duplicative work. Organizations internal to ISO or IEC that collaborate with or are in liaison to SC 29 include:
 ISO/IEC JTC 1/SC 2, Coded character sets
 ISO/IEC JTC 1/SC 6, Telecommunications and information exchange between systems
 ISO/IEC JTC 1/SC 24, Computer graphics, image processing and environmental data representation
 ISO/IEC JTC 1/SC 34, Document description and processing languages
 ISO/TC 36, Cinematography
 ISO/TC 37, Terminology and other language and content resources
 ISO/TC 37/SC 4, Language resource management
 ISO/TC 42, Photography
 ISO/TC 46/SC 9, Identification and description
 ISO/TC 130, Graphic technology
 ISO/TC 171, Document management applications
 ISO/TC 211, Geographic information/Geomatics
 ISO/TC 223, Societal security
 ISO/TC 276, Biotechnology
 IEC TC 9, Electrical equipment and systems for railways
 IEC TC 100, Audio, video and multimedia systems and equipment

Some organizations external to ISO or IEC that collaborate with or are in liaison to ISO/IEC JTC 1/SC 29, include:
 3GPP
 Advanced Function Presentation Consortium (AFPC)
 Alliance for Telecommunications Industry Solutions (ATIS)
 Asia-Pacific Broadcasting Union (ABU)
 The Association for the International Collective Management of Audiovisual Works (AGICOA)
 Audio Engineering Society (AES)
 Audio Video Coding Standard Workgroup of China (AVS)
 Advanced Television Systems Committee (ATSC)
 Consultative Committee for Space Data Systems (CCSDS)
 DICOM Standards Committee
 Digital Media Project (DMP)
 Digital TV Group (DTG)
 Digital Video Broadcasting (DVB)
 Dublin Core Metadata Initiative (DCMI)
 Ecma International
 Entertainment Content Ecosystem
 European Broadcasting Union (EBU)
 European Committee for Standardization (CEN)
 European Network on Quality of Experience in Multimedia Systems and Services (QUALINET)
 ETSI
 International Confederation of Societies of Authors and Composers (CISAC)
 International Commission on Illumination (CIE)
 International DOI Foundation (IDF)
 International Federation of Film Producers Associations (FIAPF)
 International Imaging Industry Association (I3A)
 Internet Streaming Media Alliance (ISMA)
 The Internet Society
 International Federation of the Phonographic Industry (IFPI)
 International Multimedia Telecommunications Consortium (IMTC)
 International Press and Telecommunication Council (IPTC)
 Institute of Electrical and Electronics Engineers (IEEE)
 ITU-R
 ITU-T
 JPEG 2000 Group (J2G)
 Khronos Group
 MIDI Manufacturers Association (MMA)
 National Information Standards Organization (NISO)
 North Atlantic Treaty Organization (NATO)
 Object Management Group (OMG)
 Open Geospatial Consortium (OGC)
 The Open IPTV Forum (OIPF)
 Open Mobile Alliance Ltd. (OMA)
 Open Planets Foundation (OPF)
 Society of Motion Picture and Television Engineers (SMPTE)
 The European Insurance and Reinsurance Federation (CEA)
 Video Electronics Standards Association (VESA)
 Video Services Forum (VSF)
 Virtual World Forum (VirF)
 Wireless Gigabit Alliance
 World Intellectual Property Organization (WIPO)
 World Wide Web Consortium (W3C)

Member countries
Countries pay a fee to be a member of an ISO/IEC JTC 1 subcommittee.

The 27 "P" (participating) members of ISO/IEC JTC 1/SC 29 are: Australia, Austria, Belgium, Brazil, Canada, China, Finland, France, Germany, India, Iran, Ireland, Italy, Japan, Republic of Korea, Lebanon, Netherlands, Poland, Portugal, Russian Federation, Singapore, Spain, Sweden, Switzerland, Ukraine, United Kingdom, and the United States.

The 18 "O" (observing) members of ISO/IEC JTC 1/SC 29 are: Argentina, Armenia, Bosnia and Herzegovina, Czech Republic, Denmark, Greece, Hong Kong, Hungary, Indonesia, Israel, Kazakhstan, Malaysia, Morocco, Romania, Serbia, Slovakia, South Africa, and Turkey.

Published standards
ISO/IEC JTC 1/SC 29 currently is responsible for 610 currently published standards within the field of coded representation of audio, picture, multimedia, and hypermedia information, including:

See also
 ISO/IEC JTC 1
 List of ISO standards
 Japanese Industrial Standards Committee
 International Organization for Standardization
 International Electrotechnical Commission

References

External links 
 ISO/IEC JTC 1/SC 29 home page on ISO website
 JPEG home page
 MPEG home page

029